Ghafour Jeddi Ardabili was an Iranian McDonnell Douglas F-4 Phantom II fighter pilot in the Air Force of Iran. He played a significant role in the early months of the Iran-Iraq War by halting the advancement of Iraqi tanks into the Western Iran. A statue in honor of him is placed in Tehran and in his hometown of Ardabil.

Early life
He was born in Ardabil in 1945. After finishing school, he was accepted into Iran's Air Force University and was sent to the United States of America for training in 1969.

Iran-Iraq war
There is a famous quote which Jeddi made at the start of Iran-Iraq War after suggestions from his friends to leave Iran, to which he is said to have replied: "The Government paid for us in peace status for these days."

Martyrdom
In the first 45 days of his service during the war, he had more than 80 missions. In his last mission near Basra, he faced more than 40 camouflaged Iraqi tanks from Iraq's 9th Armour Division and was successful in eliminating the entire division. But during the mission his aircraft sustained fire from Iraqi forces and was damaged, he was able to control the aircraft back into Iran's territories but wasn't able to reach his base. His jet would crash into a region between Mahshahr and Abadan  and he was forced to eject. His parachute failed to work and he was martyred in 1980 at the age of 35.

See also
Iran–Iraq War
List of Iranian commanders in the Iran–Iraq War

Notes

References
 Ghafour Jeddi  in Islamic Republic of Iran Army

1945 births
1980 deaths
1980 in Iran
People from Ardabil
Iranian military personnel killed in the Iran–Iraq War
Iranian aviators